The Speedway Grand Prix of Australia is a speedway event that is part of the Speedway Grand Prix Series.

The event was not retained in 2003, and it was 13 years before a Grand Prix returned to Australia.

The Speedway Grand Prix of Australian was resurrected in 2015, this time taking place at the Docklands Stadium in Melbourne. The event was once again won by Hancock.

Winners

Most wins
 Greg Hancock 2 times
 Chris Holder 1 time
 Jason Doyle 1 time

Future
Despite Australia being the birthplace of motorcycle speedway in 1923, and producing three World Champions since 2002 in Jason Crump (2004, 2006 and 2009), Chris Holder (2012) and Jason Doyle in 2017, as well as dual Under-21 World Champion Darcy Ward (2009, 2010), the Speedway Grand Prix of Australia had not returned to the SGP calendar as of 2014.

This changed from 2015 with Docklands Stadium in Melbourne, a 53,359 seat stadium with a retractable roof and movable seating, signing a 5-year deal to host the event. The Grand Prix was the 12th and final round of the 2015 Speedway Grand Prix series. The event didn't take place in 2018 because of Docklands Stadium pulling out of the contract and a replacement venue has yet to be found.

Triple World Champion Jason Crump and ten time Australian Champion Leigh Adams served as Australian SGP ambassadors in 2015.

References

 AGP Article. 22 October 2002
 Race report. 27 October 2002

Australia
Motorsport competitions in Australia
Grand Prix
International sports competitions hosted by Australia